Francis Patrick "Frank" Gilhooley Sr. (June 10, 1892 – July 11, 1959) was an outfielder in Major League Baseball, playing mostly as a right fielder from  through  for the St. Louis Cardinals (1911–12), New York Yankees (1913–18) and Boston Red Sox (1919).

Early life
He was born in Toledo, Ohio, and attended Central Catholic High School there.

Professional career
In a nine-season career, Gilhooley was a .271 hitter (289-for-1068) with two home runs and 58 RBI in 312 games, including 142 runs, 30 doubles 10 triples, 37 stolen bases, and a .357 on-base percentage. His most productive season came with the 1918 Yankees, when he appeared in a career-high 112 games while hitting .276 with 23 RBI, 59 runs and 19 extrabases, also career-numbers.

As an outfielder, Gilhooley played 285 games at right field (236), left (30) and center (19), recording a collective .957 fielding percentage.

He was later the player-manager of the Jersey City Skeeters in the International League in 1928 and 1929.

Personal life
He married Mae Casey in 1917, and had 3 children, Mary Irene, Mary Frances and Frank Jr. Frank Jr. announced for the Toledo Mud Hens and was also the sports director at WTVG-TV, Channel 13, until 1986.

Gilhooley died in his homeland of Toledo, Ohio, at age 67.

References

External links

1892 births
1959 deaths
Adrian Yeggs players
Baseball players from Ohio
Baseball player-managers
Boston Red Sox players
Buffalo Bisons (minor league) players
Erie Sailors players
Jersey City Skeeters players
Major League Baseball right fielders
Minor league baseball managers
Montreal Royals players
New York Yankees players
Reading Aces players
Reading Keystones players
Rochester Tribe players
Saginaw Wa-was players
Sportspeople from Toledo, Ohio
St. John's Red Storm baseball players
St. Louis Cardinals players
Toronto Maple Leafs (International League) players